This is a list of 647 species in the genus Rhyacophila, green sedges.

Rhyacophila species

References